Magicicada tredecassini is a species of periodical cicada  endemic to the United States. It has a 13-year lifecycle but is otherwise indistinguishable from the 17-year periodical cicada Magicicada cassini. The two species are usually discussed together as "cassini periodical cicadas" or "cassini-type periodical cicadas." Unlike other periodical cicadas, cassini-type males may synchronize their courting behavior so that tens of thousands of males sing and fly in unison.

Life cycle
Their median life cycle from egg to natural adult death is around thirteen years. However, their life cycle can range from nine years to seventeen years.

References

Insects of the United States
Insects described in 1962
Lamotialnini
Endemic fauna of the United States